Nan Nakhon Airport or formerly Nan Airport  serves Nan, the capital city of Nan Province, Thailand. Flights are available only one destination: Bangkok (BKK and DMK).

In 2014, a new terminal further down airport road replaced the old terminal. The same runways are still used. Upon arrival and departure, passengers are required to walk to the terminal or the plane, as no ramps extend from the terminal.

Naming 
On 15 February 2015, Princess Maha Chakri Sirindhorn went to the opening ceremony of the new terminal. During this occasion, she gave the name of "Nan Nakhon Airport" which means "the airport of Nan province".

Airlines and destinations

Previously served airlines

Statistics

Traffic by calendar year

References

External links

 Nan Airport, Dept of Civil Aviation
 
 

Airports in Thailand
Buildings and structures in Nan province
Airports established in 1980